The Maison forte de Reignac is a château in Dordogne, Nouvelle-Aquitaine, France. It is built into the rock face.

External links
 Maison Forte de Reignac - official site

Châteaux in Dordogne
Maison Forte De Reignac
Maison Forte De Reignac
Monuments historiques of Dordogne